Marcellus Joseph Johnson (born  August 13, 1971), better known as Mark "Too Sharp" Johnson, is an American former professional boxer who competed from 1990 to 2006. He is a three-time world champion in two weight classes, having held the IBF flyweight title from 1996 to 1999; the IBF junior bantamweight title from 1999 to 2000; and the WBO junior bantamweight title from 2003 to 2004.

A fast and skilled southpaw, Johnson reached a peak Ring magazine pound for pound ranking of fifth in 1998, and is the first African-American boxer to win a flyweight world title. In 2012 he was inducted into the International Boxing Hall of Fame.

Amateur career
Johnson was an amateur standout, winning the 1989 U.S. national championships at light flyweight.

Professional career

Flyweight
Johnson, defeated Francisco Tejedor to win the IBF Flyweight title in 1996.  Although he never attained significant popularity due to his weight class and lack of defining fights, he went on to become one of the top pound for pound fighters in boxing for several years. Johnson conceded in a 2001 interview that his decision to manage his career independently during his peak, rather than signing with an established promoter, contributed to his inability to secure high-profile fights, "I realized I had to have some management like a Don King or a Bob Arum or a [Lou] Duva to get these fights."

Junior Bantamweight
Johnson defended that crown seven times until April 1999, when he rose to win the IBF's junior bantamweight crown with a unanimous decision over Ratanachai Sor Vorapin at Washington, D.C.'s MCI Center (now the Verizon Center). He defended the Super Flyweight title twice. However, his career was interrupted when he was sentenced to a year in prison on a drug related parole violation as well as domestic assault charges involving his wife. While incarcerated, he was stripped of his IBF title due to inactivity.

Bantamweight
Johnson returned to the ring in 2001, scoring two consecutive wins. In his third fight at bantamweight Johnson lost in an upset to up and coming Rafael Marquez by split decision over 10 rounds later that year.  This bout was clouded by the fact that Johnson was docked two points for holding.  In the rematch the following year, Marquez took Johnson apart, winning by TKO in the 8th round.  In 2003, Johnson upset WBO super flyweight champion Fernando Montiel.  Johnson defended that title once before losing by knockout in the 8th round to Ivan Hernández. Johnson retired following his second straight loss in February 2006 after falling by eighth-round knockout to current WBC featherweight titleholder Jhonny González.

Professional boxing record

References

External links

The Trial and Tribulations of a DC Boxer, 1995 article at The Washington Post

1971 births
Boxers from Washington, D.C.
Flyweight boxers
International Boxing Federation champions
Living people
Super-flyweight boxers
World Boxing Organization champions
Winners of the United States Championship for amateur boxers
World flyweight boxing champions
World super-flyweight boxing champions
International Boxing Hall of Fame inductees
American male boxers
Bantamweight boxers